Candace N. Newell is an American politician and attorney serving as a member of the Louisiana House of Representatives from the 99th district. She assumed office on January 13, 2020, succeeding Jimmy Harris.

Background 
Newell earned a Bachelor of Science degree in psychology, Master of Science in criminology, and Juris Doctor from Southern University at New Orleans. Newell previously served as a legislative aide for Wesley Bishop and as an intern for the Louisiana Legislative Black Caucus.

References

Living people
Southern University alumni
Southern University Law Center alumni
Democratic Party members of the Louisiana House of Representatives
Women state legislators in Louisiana
21st-century American politicians
21st-century American women politicians
Year of birth missing (living people)
Place of birth missing (living people)